Gadi Schwartz (born July 18, 1983) is an American journalist working as an NBC News host and correspondent. He is the co-host of Stay Tuned, an NBC News program broadcast on Snapchat's Discover platform, Stay Tuned Now on NBC News Now, and former host of The Overview on Peacock. Stay Tuned is the first daily news show on Snapchat. He is also a reporter for NBC Nightly News and Today. In 2016, Schwartz moved from NBC-owned KNBC in Los Angeles to work as a network correspondent. He previously worked for ten years at KOB in Albuquerque, New Mexico where he was a weekend news anchor and an investigative reporter. Schwartz lives with his wife, reporter Kim Tobin and their daughter Kira in Los Angeles.

Early life and education 
Schwartz was born in Guatemala City, Guatemala. He is of Jewish and Hispanic descent and speaks Spanish. His father is Sergio Schwartz, a former journalist for Univision in Albuquerque. His mother is Karen Mings, a longtime school teacher in the Albuquerque Public Schools. The family moved from Guatemala to Belen, New Mexico, and later to Albuquerque, when he was seven years old, where he grew up. He graduated from Cibola High School and New Mexico State University.

Gadi has three younger brothers: Matthew, Sergio and David. Matthew is a doctoral student in anthropology at the University of New Mexico.

Schwartz has ADHD.

Career 
Schwartz covered the Olympic Games twice, at the 2018 Winter Olympics in PyeongChang, Korea, and at the 2016 Summer Olympics in Rio de Janeiro, Brazil. He was named "Best Investigative Reporter" and "Best Reporter" by the New Mexico Broadcaster's Association. In 2012, he was awarded the "Rocky Mountain Emmy Award" for Feature Reporting.

References 

1983 births
American male journalists
Living people
New Mexico State University alumni
People from Guatemala City
21st-century American journalists
Journalists from New Mexico
21st-century American male writers
Hispanic and Latino American journalists